Birmingham is an unincorporated community in eastern Florence Township, Erie County, Ohio, United States. It is part of the Sandusky Metropolitan Statistical Area. It is located at the intersection of State Routes 60 and 113.

Birmingham was the original site of the Woollybear Festival.

History
The community was named after Birmingham, England, for the fact its founders hoped the town eventually would boast an industrial base as famous as the English city's. A post office called Birmingham has been in operation since 1832.

On March 3, 2009, fire destroyed a restaurant and the post office in the community. Mail was rerouted to the post office in nearby Wakeman.

References

Unincorporated communities in Ohio
Unincorporated communities in Erie County, Ohio